UEFA U-17 Championship 2008 elite round is the second round of qualifications for the final tournament of UEFA U-17 Championship 2008. The winners of each group join hosts Turkey at the final tournament.

Group 1

Table

Results

Group 2

Table

Results

Group 3

Table

Results

Group 4

Table

Results

Group 5

Table

Results

Group 6

Table

Results

Group 7

Table

Results

Elite Qualification
UEFA European Under-17 Championship qualification